The 1985 Victorian Football League finals series was the 89th annual edition of the VFL/AFL final series, the Australian rules football tournament staged to determine the winner of the 1985 VFL Premiership season. The series ran over four weekends in September 1985, culminating with the 1985 VFL Grand Final at the Melbourne Cricket Ground on 28 September 1985.

The top five teams from the 1985 VFL Premiership season qualified for the finals series, which was played using the McIntyre final five system.

Qualification

Matches

The system used for the 1985 VFL finals series was the McIntyre final five system, which had been used continuously by the VFL since 1972.

Week one (qualifying and elimination finals)

Elimination final (Carlton vs North Melbourne)
The opening match of the 1985 VFL finals series saw fourth-placed  host fifth-placed  in the elimination final at VFL Park. This marked the sixth final between the two sides, having previously met in the second semi-final in 1979.

Scorecard

Qualifying final (Footscray vs Hawthorn)
The Qualifying final saw second-placed  host  at the MCG. This marked the second VFL final between the two sides - having previously met in the 1961 VFL Grand Final, which was won by Hawthorn. The Bulldogs were playing in their first VFL finals series since 1976.

Teams
The line-ups below were as published in The Football Record.

Footscray made no late changes to the starting line-up, selecting Allen Daniels and Jim Sewell as the interchange players. Hawthorn also made no changes to the starting line-up, but replaced the named interchange players - Paul Abbott and Peter Curran- with emergencies Rodney Eade and Colin Robertson.

Match Summary

Scorecard

Week two (semi-finals)

First semi-final (Footscray vs North Melbourne)
The first semi-final saw  host  at the MCG. This was the first meeting between the two clubs in a VFL final.

Teams
The line-ups below were as published in The Football Record.

North suffered a major blow before the game when captain Wayne Schimmelbusch was omitted after failing to recover from a torn thigh muscle in time, and ended up being replaced by Kym Hodgeman, with Paul Spargo and David Dwyer being confirmed as the interchange players. Footscray also made one change to its line-up, omitting Neil Peart and replacing him with Jim Sewell. Robert Groenewegen and Stephen MacPherson were the confirmed interchange players.

Match Summary
Under pressure against a North Melbourne team buzzing from its come-from-behind win against Carlton in the elimination final, the Bulldogs responded after their previous week's Qualifying final thrashing to end the Kangaroos' season and record their first VFL final victory since 1961. 

The loss of Schimmelbusch was somewhat mitigated by the return of suspended rover Jim Krakouer, who ended up being among North's best players. The first half was filled with free-flowing and vigorous play, as both sides traded goals. By mid-way through the first quarter, Footscray were down two players when Ford and Kellett came off injured within minutes of each other; the former when he was met solidly by Larkin and was stretchered off with concussion, and the latter when he came off the ground with suspected cruciate ligament damage. Despite this, the Bulldogs managed to go into half-time with a three-point lead. The game up to this point had been characterized by swings of momentum as one team would kick a string of goals in a few minutes, then the other would do the same.

The critical period of the game occurred early in the third quarter, starting at the five-minute mark when Beasley, who had comprehensively outplayed his opponent Fairley, took a superb pack mark. From the set shot, he slotted his fifth to bring up his 100th goal of the season, to the delight of fans and teammates. Then a minute later Daniels, a much-improved player from the previous week, smothered an attempted clearing kick from North defender Law and snapped his second goal. Further goals from Bamblett, Beasley and Royal capped off a ten-minute purple patch for Footscray that pushed the lead out beyond 30 points 

After the game Bulldogs coach Michael Malthouse expressed his delight with his team's turnaround in form:

Last week the guys were genuinely embarrassed and they were out today to make amends. We don't want to over emphasise revenge but we will be thinking about Hawthorn and just try to do the right things. [... The players] realise that finals are more intense. The sides that win finals are played by guys who want to do it together. Next week will be a different game at a different venue. We have six days to analyse what we will do.

Scorecard

Second semi-final (Essendon vs Hawthorn)
The second semi-final saw minor premiers  host  at VFL Park. The match was the fourth time the clubs had played in a final having contested the 1983 grand final as well as the second semi-final and grand final of 1984.

Scorecard

Week three (preliminary finals)

Preliminary final (Footscray vs Hawthorn)
The Preliminary final saw  host  at VFL Park on Saturday, 21 September. This marked the third final between the two sides and second in this series, having previously met in the Qualifying final two weeks earlier.

Scorecard

Week four (Grand Final)

References

Bibliography

External links

Australian Football League
1985 in Australian rules football